Mercedes Paz was the defending champion, but lost in the first round to Radka Zrubáková.

Zrubáková won the title by defeating Rachel McQuillan 7–6(7–3), 7–6(7–3) in the final.

Seeds
The first four seeds received a bye into the second round.

Draw

Finals

Top half

Bottom half

References

External links
 Official results archive (ITF)
 Official results archive (WTA)

Internationaux de Strasbourg - Singles
1991 Singles
Internationaux de Strasbourg